Bosselaar is a surname. Notable people with the surname include:

Laure-Anne Bosselaar (born 1943), Belgian-American poet, translator and professor
Tinus Bosselaar (1936–2018), Dutch footballer